Montrevel may refer to:

 Montrevel, Isère, a commune of the French region of Rhône-Alpes
 Montrevel, Jura, a commune of the French region of Franche-Comté
 Montrevel-en-Bresse, a commune of the French region of Rhône-Alpes